Sālim ibn 'Abd Allah ibn 'Umar ibn al-Khaṭṭāb was a well known narrator of hadith, many of which he related first hand from either his father, Abd Allah ibn Umar, or his grandfather, the caliph Umar. His paternal aunt was Hafsa bint Umar, one of Muhammad's wives.

Early Islam scholars

Notes

Muwatta Malik . Book 30 Hadith number 7

External links
  Biography of Imam Salim Ibn 'Abdi Llah Ibn 'Umar by Imam Ibn Khallikan

Tabi‘un
Tabi‘un hadith narrators
8th-century Arabs